"All His Children" is a song recorded by American country music artist Charley Pride with music by Henry Mancini. It was released in January 1972 and was the theme of the film Sometimes a Great Notion. The song peaked at number 2 on the Billboard Hot Country Singles chart. It also reached number 1 on the RPM Country Tracks chart in Canada.

The song was nominated for the Academy Award for Best Original Song in 1971.

Chart performance

Other recordings
Bing Crosby recorded the song for his 1972 album Bing 'n' Basie.

References

1972 singles
Charley Pride songs
Songs written for films
Songs with lyrics by Alan Bergman
Songs with lyrics by Marilyn Bergman
Songs with music by Henry Mancini
RCA Records singles
Scott Walker (singer) songs
1972 songs